Callionymus semeiophor, the Nusa Tenggara deepwater dragonet, is a species of dragonet native to the Pacific Ocean around Indonesia.  This species grows to a length of  SL.

References 

S
Fish described in 1983